Mark Krogh (born February 4, 1975) is an American professional stock car racing driver. He has raced in the NASCAR Busch Series, making 46 starts with a best finish of eighth, coming at both New Hampshire Motor Speedway in 1997 and Auto Club Speedway in 1998. He is the younger brother of fellow driver Jeff Krogh.

Motorsports career results

NASCAR
(key) (Bold – Pole position awarded by qualifying time. Italics – Pole position earned by points standings or practice time. * – Most laps led.)

Winston Cup Series

Busch Series

Winston West Series

References

External links
 

1975 births
NASCAR drivers
Living people
People from Kamiah, Idaho
Racing drivers from Idaho